Die grinders and rotary tools are handheld power tools used for grinding, sanding, honing, polishing, or machining material (typically metal, but also plastic or wood). All such tools are conceptually similar, with no bright dividing line between die grinders and rotary tools, although the die grinder name tends to be used for pneumatically driven heavy-duty versions whereas the rotary tool name tends to be used for electric lighter-duty versions. Flexible shaft drive versions also exist.

The die grinder name comes from one of their earliest and archetypal applications, tool and die work, where they were used to create the precise contours of dies or molds. Especially before the advent of widespread CNC usage, they were heavily relied upon for contouring via manual skill comparable to a sculptor's. CNC now provides much of the contouring for die and mold interior surfaces, but die grinders are still very useful for hundreds of cutting needs, from sculpture-like contouring in the absence of CNC, to cut-off of bar stock, to any of the cutting and grinding needs of fabrication, such as in the work of welders, boilermakers, millwrights, ironworkers (steel erectors), sheet metal workers (such as auto body workers and HVAC technicians), to woodworking (especially cabinet making), hacking, and other hobby or business pursuits. Die grinders are often used for engraving, cylinder head porting, and general shaping of a part.

Die grinders typically rotate at a high speed, typically 25,000 rpm. This is much faster than most cutting tools. As such, one must use accessories rated for such a high rpm to avoid the tool shattering.

Methods of cutting action
The cutting may be done in various ways, including: 
 Grinding with bonded abrasive stones (called by various names, such as mounted stones, mounted points, or grinding points) 
 Machining with a burr or small drill bit or endmill 
 Sanding with coated abrasive, such as small drums made of sandpaper mounted on an expanding rubber mandrel (also called an arbor) 
 Honing with fine-grit mounted points 
 Lapping with lapping compound and a mounted lap to embed it 
 Polishing or buffing with cloth or fiber drums or flaps and polishing compound

Types of cutters
 Mounted stones of many shapes and various [small or medium] sizes (also called mounted points or grinding points) 
 Burrs of many shapes and various [small or medium] sizes (also called rotary files) 
 Small drill bits 
 Small endmills 
 Small disc-shaped saw blades or milling cutters 
 Small abrasive cut-off wheels, which work like saw blades except via abrasive cutting rather than sawing per se 
 Small sanding drums 
 Small sanding flap wheels 
 Small cloth or fiber wheels, drums, and flap wheels (for holding polishing compound) 
 Mounted laps

Methods of holding the cutter
The cutter is usually held in a collet, which is a convenient means of chucking in this application and provides the concentricity needed for high-RPM use. It also allows for quick changes in cutters. In some applications, other quick-change indexable chucking systems can be used, similar to the indexable chucking types now commonly found on consumer pistol-grip drills.

Safety

Personal protective equipment (PPE)
The most universal safety precaution in die grinder use is to protect one's eyes by wearing safety glasses. 

Other common PPE in die grinder use includes: 
 Other eye and face protection, such as safety goggles or a face shield, which is simply a polycarbonate window, hanging from a headband, between one's face and the work. All eye protectors come in clear versions as well as various levels of shading (for grinding that produces enough sparks to warrant shading, like torching or welding do). 
 Hearing protection, such as ear plugs or headphones (die grinders are often quite loud, even just running unloaded, but even more so while cutting). 
 Skin protection, such as work gloves (and in some special applications, fire-retardant clothing because of the sparks, although the sparks are usually harmless in most applications). 
 Protection for the respiratory and alimentary tracts (mouth, throat, lungs, gut), such as simple paper masks or, in special applications, a respirator. Masks may be trivial in many applications but important in others. Any abrasive cutting generates dust, from both the abrasive itself and from the workpiece. Depending on the materials and amounts, masks may be needed.

Safety features built into the tool
Most pneumatic die grinder throttles (also called triggers) feature a spring-loaded "kickstand" mechanism between the throttle lever and the body of the grinder. This prevents the throttle from opening (being pressed down towards the body of the grinder) without operator intervention and inhibits accidental activation. It is similar in principle to the safety catches used on many handguns. 

Tools with electric motors often have electrical safety features such as grounded cases (wired to a grounding conductor, which uses the grounding prong on a plug) or double insulation. Some may have both, but this is uncommon, because regulatory requirements require only one or the other.

See also 
 Multi-tool (power tool)

References
3. https://www.makitatools.com/products/details/GD0600

Grinding and lapping
Metalworking hand tools
Hand-held power tools